Lidopus heidemanni is a species of jumping tree bug in the family Miridae. It is found in Central America and North America.

References

Further reading

 
 
 
 
 
 
 
 

Miridae
Insects described in 1917